Technological University, Pakokku is situated beside the Pakokku–Yesagyo road. It is about 8 miles and 4 furlongs far from Pakokku. Kyauk Hlae Khar village is situated to the north, Pantinechone village at the south and Oakkan village at the west. Technological University covers 100.32 acres. The university was opened as G.T.I (Government Technological Institute) on 27 December 1999. It was promoted to GTC (Government Technological College) on 20 October 2002. It was promoted to Technological University on 20 January 2007.

Departments 
 Cilvil Engineering Department
 Electronic and Communication Department
 Electrical Power Engineering Department
 Mechanical Engineering Department
 Academic Department

Program 
The university offers Bachelor of Engineering and Bachelor of Technology degrees

See also 
 Technological University, Magway
 List of Technological Universities in Myanmar

References

External links

Technological universities in Myanmar